Pablo Cuevas was the defending champion, but chose not to participate.

Seeds

Draw

Finals

Top half

Bottom half

References
 Main Draw
 Qualifying Draw

Seguros Bolivar Open Barranquilla - Singles
2014 Singles